Thomas Weeding Baggallay later Thomas Weeding Weeding (11 June 1847 – 19 December 1929) was a solicitor and an English first-class cricketer who played for Surrey as a wicketkeeper between 1865 and 1874. He was born in St Pancras, London and died in Addlestone, Surrey.

Baggallay changed his surname to Weeding in 1868 by royal licence. He qualified as a solicitor in 1870 and was Clerk to the Surrey County Council for more than thirty years. In 1927 he was appointed a Deputy-Lieutenant for the County of Surrey.

Baggalay married Alice Maude Elizabeth and they had two sons and two daughters; both sons were killed during the First World War. Baggalay, died aged 82, following a fall from a chair on 19 December 1929 at Kingthorpe, Addlestone.

References

1847 births
1929 deaths
English cricketers
Surrey cricketers
English solicitors
Deputy Lieutenants of Surrey
Gentlemen of the South cricketers